Robert "Bob" Verbeeck (born 5 August 1960 in Tessenderlo) is a retired Belgian long-distance runner. He is best known for winning the gold medal in the 3000 metres at the 1985 European Indoor Championships. In addition, he represented his country at the 1984 Summer Olympics reaching the semifinals of the 5000 metres.

He studied economics at the Iowa State University and nowadays is the CEO of a sports marketing agency, Golazo.

International competitions

1Did not finish in the final

Personal bests
Outdoor
1500 metres – 3:36.96 (Woluwe 1984)
One mile – 3:57.98 (Luxembourg 1983)
3000 metres – 7:47.22 (Rome 1984)
5000 metres – 13:24.73 (Kessel-Lo 1984)
Indoor
One mile – 3:57.81 (Cosford 1985)
3000 metres – 7:55.94 (Paris 1985)

References

All-Athletics profile

1960 births
Living people
Belgian male long-distance runners
Athletes (track and field) at the 1984 Summer Olympics
Olympic athletes of Belgium
Sportspeople from Limburg (Belgium)
20th-century Belgian people